Marcin Bogusławski (born 1980) is a Polish artist, painter, drawer, graphic and mural painter. He lives and works in Warsaw.

Education 
Marcin Bogusławski has studied painting and graphics at the Academy of Fine Arts in Warsaw. During his studies (2000-2006) he attended also the guest workshop run by professor Leon Tarasewicz.  In 2006 graduated from painting (diploma under supervision of professor Stanisław Baj and diploma appendix from mural painting under supervision of professor Edward Tarkowski).

Selected exhibitions

References

Bibliography 
 Marcin Bogusławski - oficjalna strona artysty
 ArtInfo - Indeks artystów

Polish contemporary artists
1980 births
Living people
Academy of Fine Arts in Warsaw alumni